Durwood Lee Keeton (born August 14, 1952) is a former American football defensive back who played one season with the New England Patriots of the National Football League. He was drafted by the St. Louis Cardinals in the fourth round of the 1974 NFL Draft. He first enrolled at Navarro College before transferring to the University of Oklahoma. Keeton attended Bonham High School in Bonham, Texas. He was also a member of the Southern California Sun and Tampa Bay Buccaneers.

College career

Navarro College
Keeton played for the Navarro Bulldogs from 1970 to 1971.

University of Oklahoma
Keeton transferred to play for the Oklahoma Sooners from 1972 to 1973. He earned All-Big Eight honors while also playing in the Blue–Gray and Senior Bowl games.

Professional career
Keeton was selected by the St. Louis Cardinals with the 85th pick in the 1974 NFL draft.

Southern California Sun
Keeton played for the Southern California Sun of the World Football League in 1974, returning one interception for a touchdown.

New England Patriots
Keeton played in twelve games for the New England Patriots during the 1975 season.

Tampa Bay Buccaneers
Keeton was drafted by the Tampa Bay Buccaneers in the 1976 NFL expansion draft. He was released by the team during training camp.

References

External links
Just Sports Stats

Living people
1952 births
Players of American football from Texas
American football defensive backs
Navarro Bulldogs football players
Oklahoma Sooners football players
Southern California Sun players
New England Patriots players
People from Bonham, Texas